Yury Yurievich Suvorau (born March 29, 1991 in Vitebsk) is a Belarusian swimmer, who specialized in individual medley events. Suvorau qualified for the men's 400 m individual medley, as a member of the Belarusian swimming team, at the 2012 Summer Olympics in London, by attaining a B-standard entry time of 4:23.35. Suvorau challenged seven other swimmers in the second heat, including two-time Olympian Raphaël Stacchiotti of Luxembourg. He finished the race in a third-place tie with Portugal's Diogo Carvalho, in a new Belarusian record time of 4:23.06. Suvorau, however, failed to advance into the final, as he placed twenty-sixth out of 37 swimmers in the preliminary heats.

References

External links
NBC Olympics Profile

1991 births
Living people
Belarusian male swimmers
Olympic swimmers of Belarus
Swimmers at the 2012 Summer Olympics
Male medley swimmers
Sportspeople from Vitebsk